Ten-Thirty on a Summer Night is a 1960 novel by the French writer Marguerite Duras. It was adapted into the 1966 film 10:30 P.M. Summer.

See also
 1960 in literature
 20th-century French literature

References

1960 French novels
Novels by Marguerite Duras
French novels adapted into films
Éditions Gallimard books